David Ferrer is the defending champion. He successfully defended his title by defeating 8th seed Fernando Verdasco, 6–1, 6–2 in the final.

Seeds

Draw

Finals

Top half

Bottom half

Qualifying

Seeds

Qualifiers

Draw

First qualifier

Second qualifier

Third qualifier

Fourth qualifier

References
 Main Draw
 Qualifying Draw

Abierto Mexicano Telcel - Singles
2012 Abierto Mexicano Telcel